Havana Elsa is an American reality television web series that was released on September 17, 2012, on the official website for Bravo. A spin-off to The Real Housewives of Miami, the series featured Elsa Patton, also known as Mama Elsa, the mother of full-time cast member of The Real Housewives of Miami Marysol Patton, embarking on launching her own coffee line, also titled Havana Elsa.

Development
Bravo released the web series titled Havana Elsa on September 17, 2012, while season two of The Real Housewives of Miami was airing. The series starred Elsa Patton, known as Mama Elsa, the mother of full-time cast member of The Real Housewives of Miami Marysol Patton. The series depicted Patton launching her own coffee line, also titled Havana Elsa. The series consists of 9 episodes. After the conclusion of the second season of The Real Housewives of Miami, Patton's health had deteriorated when she suffered a brain injury after a fall in her home. Despite her health issues, Patton continued to appear on the third season of The Real Housewives of Miami. Patton died on May 12, 2019, aged 84; she was predeceased by her husband of 50 years, Donald Patton, who died in February 2018.

Episodes

References

External links
 

Television shows set in Miami
Bravo (American TV network) original programming
The Real Housewives spin-offs
2012 web series debuts
2012 web series endings
English-language television shows